Boayan Island is the largest island in San Vicente, Palawan, Philippines. The island is not alienable nor disposable, categorized as timberland and therefore remains government property belonging to the public.

See also
 List of islands of the Philippines

References

External links
 Boayan Island at OpenStreetMap
 Save Boayan : sign the online petition

Islands of Palawan
Islands of the Philippines